The Crocodile Society was a West African secret society that practised cannibalism. The Crocodile Society existed in Liberia and Sierra Leone in the late 1800s and early 1900s.

See also 
 Leopard Society
 Poro society
 Secret society

References

Harley, George Way (1941) Native African Medicine: With Special Reference to Its Practice in the Mano Tribe of Liberia Harvard University Press, Cambridge, MA, p. 140;
Mitchell, Harry (2002) Remote Corners: A Sierra Leone Memoir The Radcliffe Press, London, pp. 191–192,  ;
Refugee renewal tribunal: Liberian secret societies - Neegee society https://www.refworld.org/pdfid/4b6fe2890.pdf

External links
 1900-1950: The Leopard Society in 'Vai country' in Bassaland

African secret societies
Cannibalism in Africa
Social history of Liberia
History of Sierra Leone